Mariuccia Medici (18 February 1910 – 23 February 2012) was an Italian-born Swiss actress, known for roles in television and theater.

She performed many of her works in the Ticinese and Swiss Italian dialects used in Ticino. In 2001, she penned an opinion piece on the importance the preservation of the dialects in swissinfo. She worked as a primary school teacher for more than forty years in Lugano.

Medici died on 23 February 2012, in Lugano, Switzerland, aged 102.

See also
 List of centenarians (actors, filmmakers and entertainers)

References

External links
 
 Casoni, Matteo: Mariuccia Medici, in: Kotte, Andreas (a.c.): Dizionario teatrale Svizzero, Chronos Verlag Zurigo 2005, vol. 2, pp. 1214–15, vedi immagine p. 1215.

1910 births
2012 deaths
Swiss stage actresses
Italian emigrants to Switzerland
Italian stage actresses
Italian educators
Swiss centenarians
People from Lugano
Swiss television actresses
Actresses from Milan
Women centenarians